Nancy Lee Grahn (born April 28, 1956) is an American actress known primarily for her work in daytime soap operas, portraying Julia Wainwright Capwell on Santa Barbara from 1985–93 and Alexis Davis on General Hospital  since 1996.

Early life and career 
Grahn was born in Evanston, Illinois, to a Jewish mother, Barbara Edna Ascher, and a Lutheran father, Robert Donald Grahn. Her parents were both involved with their local community theater in Skokie. Grahn's first stage appearance was as a pony in a community production of Oklahoma!  At Niles North High School, she played "Daisy Mae" opposite future Broadway actor Gregg Edelman in the school's production of Lil' Abner. As a freshman at the University of Illinois at Urbana-Champaign, Grahn landed her first credited role, as Mimi in Guys and Dolls at the Goodman Rep Theater, 1973–74 season.

Grahn subsequently went to New York City, where she studied acting with noted drama teachers Sandy Meisner and Bill Epsen. Here she had roles in productions of A Midsummer Night's Dream and Barefoot in the Park. She also appeared in commercials and several industrial films; in an interview, Grahn recalled crossing paths with fellow future soap star Kim Zimmer at the production of several of those films. She also continued to perform in numerous plays, such as Father's Day and Two for the Seesaw, among others.

Television roles 
Grahn has made a number of appearances in episodic prime time television, including Little House on the Prairie, Murder, She Wrote, Magnum, P.I., Diagnosis: Murder, Perry Mason, The Incredible Hulk, Knight Rider and Babylon 5. She has also been seen in the recurring role of Denise Fielding on Melrose Place, as Connie Dahlgren on Murder One, and as Principal Russell on 7th Heaven.

Grahn also has had several roles on daytime dramas. Her first television role was as Beverly Wilkes, Marco Dane's secretary on ABC's One Life to Live from 1978 to 1982. In 1985, she was cast as headstrong lawyer Julia Wainwright Capwell, on the now-defunct soap opera Santa Barbara. Julia was a departure from the traditional "damsel in distress" or vixen roles; she was an intelligent, uncompromising woman. Julia was paired with Mason Capwell, and the two had a Tracy/Hepburn-esque romance. Offscreen, Grahn was briefly involved with Mason's portrayer, actor Lane Davies; conflict over their storylines eventually led to Davies' departure from the series. Grahn's performance garnered her a Daytime Emmy Award for Best Supporting Actress in 1989, an award which she shares with All My Children actress Debbi Morgan. She portrayed the role of Julia until the show's cancellation in 1993.

In 1996, she was cast as Alexis Davis, another headstrong lawyer, on General Hospital. She was nominated for several additional Daytime Emmys, winning in the Outstanding Supporting Actress category in 2012. In July 2010, Grahn re-signed with General Hospital for another four years on the show.

Political views 
A liberal, Grahn is outspoken in political matters. In 2000, she organized a television conference for fellow Democratic daytime stars titled "Daytime for Gore/Lieberman". The event was held at the home of Gary Tomlin, director of NBC's Passions, and in attendance were Sharon Davis, wife of then-California Governor Gray Davis, and Kristin Gore, daughter of then-Vice President Al Gore. During the 2008 presidential election, she hosted an online chat along with fellow daytime actors to discuss the election with fans.

Grahn is an active proponent of reproductive rights. She created "Daytime for Choice" in 1988, and discussed with the New York Times in 2007 her decision to have an abortion when she was in her 20s as well as her desire to see abortion depicted in a fair and unbiased light within film and television. Grahn is also a supporter of LGBT rights and has participated in the NOH8 Campaign.

Personal life 
Grahn is a single mother to one daughter, Katherine Grace, known as Kate, born on February 24, 1998, who studies music at the University of Southern California (USC). 
In December 2019, Grahn announced her engagement to guitarist Richard Smith of Eugene, Oregon, who is a professor at the Thornton School of Music at USC in LA. Grahn has two sisters, Wendy Grahn and Suzi Gantz of Illinois.
She is also involved in various charities, including Meals on Wheels.

Filmography

Awards and nominations

See also
 List of University of Illinois at Urbana-Champaign people

References

External links
 Official website
 

1956 births
Living people
American soap opera actresses
Actresses from Evanston, Illinois
Daytime Emmy Award winners
Daytime Emmy Award for Outstanding Supporting Actress in a Drama Series winners
American television actresses
American LGBT rights activists
20th-century American actresses
21st-century American actresses
American film actresses
American people of Jewish descent
Illinois Democrats